Vladimir Olegovich Ovchinnikov (born 2 August 1970 in Volgograd) is a retired male javelin thrower from Russia, who competed in three Summer Olympics, starting in 1988 (Seoul, South Korea) for the Soviet Union. He set his personal best on 14 May 1995 in Tolyatti, throwing 88.00 metres.

International competitions

Seasonal bests by year
1988 – 80.26
1990 – 81.78
1993 – 77.98
1995 – 88.00
1996 – 78.20
1997 – 78.40
1999 – 80.29
2000 – 82.60
2001 – 78.72

References

 

1970 births
Living people
Sportspeople from Volgograd
Russian male javelin throwers
Soviet male javelin throwers
Olympic male javelin throwers
Olympic athletes of the Soviet Union
Olympic athletes of Russia
Athletes (track and field) at the 1988 Summer Olympics
Athletes (track and field) at the 1996 Summer Olympics
Athletes (track and field) at the 2000 Summer Olympics
Universiade medalists in athletics (track and field)
Universiade silver medalists for the Soviet Union
Medalists at the 1991 Summer Universiade
World Athletics Championships athletes for Russia
World Athletics U20 Championships winners
Russian Athletics Championships winners
New Zealand Athletics Championships winners